Idol Records is a Dallas, Texas-based record label and publishing company founded in 1993 by Erv Karwelis, who serves as president of the label. Its roster consists of bands such as The O's, Dead Flowers, The Crash That Took Me, Here Holy Spain, Sponge, Watershed, and Flickerstick. In January 2009, Idol launched an art-pop sub label Exploding Plastic Records. The first band signed to the label was Little Black Dress.

Idol Records received the Dallas Observer Music Award for "Best Record Label" 2002, 2003, 2004, 2005, 2006 & 2007.

Idol Records is a member of the National Academy of Recording Arts and Sciences (NARAS).

Artists

 Admirals
 The American Fuse
 Aztec Milk Temple
 Billyclub
 Black Tie Dynasty
 Boys Named Sue
 Calhoun
 Centro-matic
 Charming Gardeners
 Chomsky
 Clumsy
 Cold Cash Machine
 The Crash That Took Me 
 Daryl
 Darstar
 Dead Flowers
 The Deathray Davies
 Descender
 Dove Hunter
 The Fags
 The Falcon Project
 Feisty Cadavers
 Flickerstick
 Funland
 GBH
 Gaston Light
 Gunfighter
 Hagfish
 Here Holy Spain
 Hoarse
 Chris Holt
 Jetta in the Ghost Tree
 Lorelei K
 Trey Johnson
 Will Johnson
 Little Black Dress
 Macavity
 The Mag Seven
 Mazinga Phaser
 Mitra
 MOTORCADE
 Moxy Roxx
 Name the Moon
 The O's
 Old 97's
 The Paper Chase
 Pervis
 Vanessa Peters
 Pikahsso
 Todd Pipes
 Protest
 PPT
 Puke A Rama
 Red Like Heat  
 Glen Reynolds
 Secrecies
 Shibboleth
 Skeemin' NoGoods
 The Slack
 Sponge
 Tahiti
 These Machines Are Winning
 Vehicles
 The Warden
 Watershed

See also
List of record labels

General references
Black White Read Idol Records Feature
Dallas Observer Indie label feature

External links
Official site

American record labels
Indie rock record labels
American independent record labels
Record labels established in 1993
Alternative rock record labels
Rock record labels